Laevaricella perlucens is a species of tropical, air-breathing land snail, a terrestrial pulmonate gastropod mollusk in the family Oleacinidae.

Distribution 
Laevaricella perlucens is endemic to Dominica. The type locality is "on Morne Diablotin, the north end on the island", Dominica.

Laevaricella perlucens is very restricted in range and probably meet the IUCN-criteria of Critically Endangered species.

Description 
Laevaricella perlucens was originally discovered and described (under the name Glandina perlucens) by British-born naturalist Robert John Lechmere Guppy in 1868.

Guppy's original text (the type description) reads in Latin language and in English language as follows:

This species had never been collected since it was described by Guppy (1868) until 2009 and his type material was subsequently lost. The single specimen collected alive in 2009 allowed figure this species for the first time.

Ecology 
This species is restricted to higher localities. It does not occur, however, on the upper slopes of the higher peaks, but it seems to be restricted to the hygrophytic vegetation zone (cloud forest).

References
This article incorporates public domain text from the reference and CC-BY-3.0 text from the reference.

Oleacinidae
Endemic fauna of Dominica
Gastropods described in 1868